RT PCR may refer to:
 Real-time polymerase chain reaction
 Reverse transcription polymerase chain reaction (RT-PCR)